András Hess set up a printing press in Buda in 1472.
He printed the first book in Hungary on 5 June 1473 in his Buda press. Hess was probably of German origin. He dedicated the book, the Chronica Hungarorum or Buda Chronicle to László Karai, provost of Buda, who had invited him to Hungary.

Today a square is named after him in Budapest.

References 

Hungarian publishers (people)
15th-century Hungarian people
People from Buda
Hungarian-German people
Printers of incunabula
15th-century printers
Hungarian printers